Stephen Bernard Blumenfeld is an American-New Zealand labor-relations academic.

Academic career
After degrees from Carroll University, University of Wisconsin-Madison and  University of Illinois at Urbana–Champaign, Blumenfeld got his PhD, also from Illinois, in 1997. He started at Victoria University of Wellington in  1999, rising to become Senior Lecturer and Director of the  Centre for Labour Employment and Work. He has also worked at Drake University and Simon Fraser University

Blumenfeld's work regularly gets reported in the New Zealand national media.

In 2013 he was awarded a Meritorious Service Award by the Tertiary Education Union.

Selected works 
 Malik, A., & Blumenfeld, S. (2012). Six Sigma, quality management systems and the development of organisational learning capability: Evidence from four business process outsourcing organisations in India. International Journal of Quality & Reliability Management, 29(1), 71–91.
 Malik, A., Sinha, A., & Blumenfeld, S. (2012). Role of quality management capabilities in developing market-based organisational learning capabilities: Case study evidence from four Indian business process outsourcing firms. Industrial Marketing Management, 41(4), 639–648.
 Blumenfeld, S. B., & Partridge, M. D. (1996). The long-run and short-run impacts of global competition on US union wages. Journal of Labor Research, 17(1), 149–171.
 Blumenfeld, S. B., & Thickett, G. (2003). Surfing the knowledge wave: The impact of information and communication technology (ICT) on'decent work'in New Zealand. New Zealand Journal of Employment Relations, 28(1), 1.
 Plimmer, G., Wilson, J., Bryson, J., Blumenfeld, S., Donnelly, N., & Ryan, B. (2013). Workplace dynamics in New Zealand public services. Wellington: Industrial Relations Centre, Victoria University of Wellington, 56–60.

References

External links
 
 institutional homepage

Living people
Carroll University alumni
University of Wisconsin–Madison alumni
University of Illinois Urbana-Champaign alumni
Academic staff of the Victoria University of Wellington
Drake University faculty
Academic staff of Simon Fraser University
Year of birth missing (living people)